Mariinsky is a rural locality (a selo) in Otradovsky Selsoviet, Sterlitamaksky District, Bashkortostan, Russia. The population was 1,896 as of 2010. There are 23 streets.

Geography 
Mariinsky is located 6 km west of Sterlitamak (the district's administrative centre) by road. Sterlitamak is the nearest rural locality.

References 

Rural localities in Sterlitamaksky District